Harold Paulk Henderson is a retired political science professor at Abraham Baldwin Agricultural College (ABAC) in Tifton, Georgia and an author. He wrote books on Georgia governors Ellis Arnall and Ernest Vandiver. Recordings of the interviews he conducted for the books have been collected by the Library of Congress in its Civil Rights Collection and in the University of Georgia's Richard B. Russell Library for Political Research and Studies along with eight VHS recordings from a symposium on Georgia governors he directed along with Gary L. Roberts at ABAC in 1985.

Bibliography
Ernest Vandiver, Governor of Georgia, 2000
The Politics of Change in Georgia: A Political Biography of Ellis Arnall, University of Georgia Press, 1991 
Georgia Governors in an Age of Change: From Ellis Arnall to George Busbee, co-editor with Gary L. Roberts, 1988
Several entries in the New Georgia Encyclopedia

References

American political scientists
Year of birth missing (living people)
Living people